Rippon station is a Virginia Railway Express station located at 15511 Farm Creek Drive in Woodbridge, Virginia. The station, one of two VRE stations in Woodbridge, is located at a southerly dead end, and is named for the closest and last intersection with Farm Creek Drive. It serves the Fredericksburg Line and shares the right-of-way with Amtrak's Northeast Regional,  Silver Meteor, Silver Star,  Palmetto, Auto Train, and Carolinian trains; however, no Amtrak trains stop here. Rippon station is located along the west side of the Featherstone National Wildlife Refuge.

Station layout
Rippon has one low-level side platform serving Virginia Railway Express on both tracks. Amtrak's Northeast Regional, Silver Star, Silver Meteor,  Palmetto, Carolinian, and Auto Train services pass through the station without stopping.

References

External links 
Rippon VRE Station

Transportation in Prince William County, Virginia
Virginia Railway Express stations
Railway stations in the United States opened in 1992
1992 establishments in Virginia